Kshirode Prasad Vidyavinode ( Kṣīrōda prasāda bidyābhinōḍa) (12 April 1863 – 4 July 1927), born  Kshirode Chandra Bhattacharya was a Bengali Indian poet, novelist, dramatist and nationalist.

Early life and education
He was born Kshirode Chandra Bhattacharya in Khardah on 12 April 1863, to a Brahmin family. He had joined Khardah Banga Vidyalaya and passed his upper primary examination in 1874. Later he joined the Barrackpore Government School, after changing his middle name and became known as Kshirode Prasad Bhattacharya. He passed his entrance examination under the University of Calcutta in 1881, and joined Vidyasagar College and afterwards the General Assembly's Institution, (now known as the Scottish Church College). After earning his postgraduate degree from the University of Calcutta, he joined the Chandernagore Dupleix College as its chemistry teacher, and subsequently taught at his alma mater, the General Assembly's Institution.

Later life
After adopting a different surname Vidyavinode, he embarked on a long and distinguished literary career, and wrote stories, dramas, novels and poems. The thespian on the Bengali stage, Sisir Bhaduri began his professional career with Kshirode Prasad’s play Alamgir. Some of his notable plays were Ali Baba, Banger Pratap Aditya (Pratapaditya of Bengal), Palashir Prayashchitta (The Remorse of Plassey), Nabanarayan and Dada Didi (Brother and Sister). He also edited the journal Aloukik Rahasya (Tales of the Supernatural).

The British colonial regime banned Palashir Prayashchitta and Dada Didi because of their anti-colonial stances. He had joined the movement protesting the partition of Bengal in 1905.

He lived in Bagbazar, north Calcutta, and died on 4 July 1927 in Bankura.

Commemoration
The road Kshirode Vidyavinode Avenue in Bagbazar commemorates his name. Also his bust was installed on the premises of Sri Guru library on the initiative of this library in Khardah, the Khardah municipality and Sutanuti Boimela Committee on 12 April 2012.

References

External links 

 Kshirode Prasad Vidyavinode at Bengali wikisource

1863 births
1927 deaths
Bengali novelists
Bengali male poets
Bengali theatre personalities
Scottish Church College alumni
University of Calcutta alumni
Academic staff of Scottish Church College
Academic staff of the University of Calcutta
Writers from Kolkata
Novelists from West Bengal
19th-century Indian novelists
20th-century Indian novelists